Kathryn Rosemary Bullard (born January 27, 1987), known professionally as Katy Rose, is an American singer-songwriter and producer. Rose released two studio albums, Because I Can (V2 Records) and Candy Eyed (River Jones Music). Since her last album, Rose has released eight independent singles.

Rose received recognition for her songs "Overdrive" and "Lemon", which were featured in the films Mean Girls and Thirteen, respectively.

Early life
Rose was born in Los Angeles, California, in 1987 to two musicians: her father was session musician Kim Bullard, and her mother performed backing vocals. Growing up, Rose recalls spending time in the recording studio, meeting Alanis Morissette, Weird Al Yankovic, the Goo Goo Dolls and Tori Amos. Rose began creating musical works of her own at the age of 13, which gained the attention of several record labels. She signed to V2 Records, and released her debut album Because I Can.

Music career

2004–2007: Because I Can and commercial success
Rose's debut album, Because I Can, was released on 27 January 2004, on her 17th birthday. The album was preceded by the single "Overdrive", which gained Top 10 airplay in France, Switzerland and South Africa, in addition to becoming a US Adult Top 40 hit. The song was also featured in the 2004 film Mean Girls, in addition to prominently being featured on the film's soundtrack. Other songs on the album were featured in Agent Cody Banks, Dawson's Creek and Grey's Anatomy.

Rose toured for two years with the Cardigans, Liz Phair and the Calling. While touring, she also performed alongside N.E.R.D. and Avril Lavigne. "Overdrive" reached number 1 in Japan's airplay chart, and made MTV's Top 20 video countdown.

2008–present: Candy Eyed and further releases 
Since Because I Can, Rose has worked as a songwriter in Los Angeles, Stockholm, Paris, Nashville, ATL, NY, and London. Her songs have been featured in The Sims 3 by Electronic Arts, and her most recent collaborations have been with 2Cellos and goth rapper Kobenz. She is currently playing shows with her band in Paris, and released Candy Eyed in 2007 and has since frequently released independent singles starting from 2014.

Discography

Albums

Singles

Guest appearances

Other appearances

References

External links

 
 Katy Rose on Facebook

1987 births
Living people
21st-century American singers
21st-century American women singers
American child singers
American women pop singers
American women singer-songwriters
Actors from Redondo Beach, California
Musicians from Redondo Beach, California
Singers from Los Angeles
Singer-songwriters from California